The Global Honored Crown Openweight Hardcore Championship was a semi-official professional wrestling championship contested in Pro Wrestling Noah. It was originally created in 2004 as a singles title known as the GHC Openweight Hardcore Championship; in 2007 it was announced that it would be reformed into a tag team title, continuing with the same lineage as the original belt. Later in 2007, it reverted to being a singles championship.

The Openweight Hardcore Championship, also known as the Global Hardcore Crown, had a unique stipulation attached to it: if the challenger was smaller than the champion, and lasted for 15 minutes, they would win the title. It could also change hands on a countout.

Kentaro Shiga, who was the 5th champion before the reforming into a tag team championship, was still recognized as such (along with his tag team partner, Kishin Kawabata), even though it was vacated to be decided in a tournament, which they won.

On November 19, 2007, Kawabata defeated Shiga to reunify the title. The title has remained inactive since June 2010.

Title history

Combined reigns

References

External links
  GHC Hardcore Openweight Championship

Pro Wrestling Noah championships
Openweight wrestling championships
Hardcore wrestling championships